Aleksandr Aleksandrovich Petrov (born 27 May 1984) is a former Russian professional football player.

Club career
He made his Russian Football National League debut for FC Anzhi Makhachkala on 26 March 2006 in a game against FC KAMAZ Naberezhnye Chelny. He played 5 seasons in the FNL for Anzhi, FC Volgar-Gazprom-2 Astrakhan and FC Torpedo Vladimir.

External links
 

1984 births
Living people
Russian footballers
FC Anzhi Makhachkala players
FC Torpedo Moscow players
FC Volgar Astrakhan players
Association football defenders
FC Torpedo Vladimir players